Ronald Saunders (6 November 1932 – 7 December 2019) was an English football player and manager. He played for Everton, Tonbridge Angels, Gillingham, Portsmouth, Watford and Charlton Athletic during a 16-year playing career, before moving into management. He managed seven clubs in 20 years, and he was the first manager to have taken charge of Aston Villa, Birmingham City and West Bromwich Albion, the three rival clubs based in and around the city of Birmingham

Saunders also managed Yeovil Town, Oxford United, Norwich City and Manchester City. He was involved in football for 36 consecutive years; he left his final managerial role, at West Bromwich Albion, at the age of 54.

Playing career
As a player, he was an old-fashioned, hard-shooting centre forward who scored 246 goals in 16 years for Everton, Tonbridge Angels, Gillingham, Portsmouth, Watford and Charlton Athletic. Saunders was leading goalscorer for six consecutive seasons at Portsmouth and his goals were a key factor in helping Pompey win the Third Division title in 1962. He remains their third highest goalscorer. He retired from full-time playing in 1967, when with Charlton.

Managerial career

Early career
Saunders became player-manager at non-league Yeovil Town.

Norwich City
As a manager, Saunders first tasted success at Norwich City, guiding them to the Second Division title in 1972, which saw them promoted to the First Division for the first time in their history. Saunders steered Norwich City to survival in their first season in the top flight. They also reached the Football League Cup final, losing 1–0 to Tottenham Hotspur. He resigned as Norwich manager on 17 November 1973 following a boardroom row after a 3–1 home defeat to Everton.

Manchester City
Five days later, Saunders accepted an offer to take over at Manchester City. For the second season running Saunders managed a team to the Football League Cup final, but once again they lost – this time to Wolverhampton Wanderers. Despite their cup success, City's league form was shaky, and Saunders was dismissed three weeks before the end of the season. He did not stay out of work for long however, and the following month joined Second Division side Aston Villa as manager.

Aston Villa
He guided Villa to promotion to the First Division (as runners-up in the Second Division) in his first season as manager, also winning the League Cup. He became the first manager to take three clubs to the League Cup Final in three successive years. He re-established Villa as a top First Division club, winning the League Cup again in 1977. In 1980–81, he guided Villa to their first First Division title for 71 years.

He resigned from Villa on 9 February 1982, due to a disagreement with the board over his contract. At the time, Villa were mid-table in the First Division and had reached the quarter-finals of the European Cup. His assistant Tony Barton took over, and led them to victory in the 1982 European Cup Final four months later.

Birmingham City
He moved straight to Villa's local rivals, Birmingham City. They went down in 1984 but he got them back into the top flight at the first attempt. In January 1986, Saunders walked out on struggling Birmingham to take charge of local rivals and fellow strugglers West Bromwich Albion.

West Bromwich Albion
He was unable to stop Albion from sliding into the Second Division and was dismissed in September 1987, after failing to get them back into the First Division. This was his last managerial role.

Retirement
In a friendly fixture staged as a testimonial for the recently deceased Tony Barton, Saunders appeared at Villa Park in 1994 as manager of a Villa side drawn mostly from players who had played in the European Cup final in 1982, against a West Midlands all-stars side. This was the first time he had returned to the club since his resignation some 13 years earlier. In December 2006, the 74-year-old Saunders was the guest of honour at Villa Park for the match between Aston Villa and Manchester United, invited by new chairman Randy Lerner. He returned to Villa Park shortly after, on 5 May 2007, for the 25th anniversary celebrations of the 1982 European Cup win.

Death
Saunders died on 7 December 2019, aged 87.

Honours

Player
England U18
FIFA Youth Tournament: 1948

Portsmouth
Third Division: 1961–62

Manager
Norwich City
Second Division: 1971–72

Aston Villa
First Division: 1980–81
FA Charity Shield: 1981 (shared)
Football League Cup: 1974–75, 1976–77

See also
 List of English football championship-winning managers

References

Bibliography

1932 births
2019 deaths
Sportspeople from Birkenhead
English footballers
Association football forwards
Everton F.C. players
Tonbridge Angels F.C. players
Gillingham F.C. players
Portsmouth F.C. players
Watford F.C. players
Charlton Athletic F.C. players
English Football League players
English football managers
Yeovil Town F.C. managers
Oxford United F.C. managers
Norwich City F.C. managers
Manchester City F.C. managers
Aston Villa F.C. managers
Birmingham City F.C. managers
West Bromwich Albion F.C. managers
Footballers from Merseyside